Cruel Hand is an American hardcore punk band from Portland, Maine, that formed in 2006. As of 2013, Cruel Hand has released four full-length albums: Without a Pulse on 6131 Records, Prying Eyes and Lock & Key on Bridge 9 Records and The Negatives on Hopeless Records. The band has also released three EPs on Bridge 9: Life in Shambles, Cruel Hand and Born Into Debt, We All Owe a Death. Their song "Face to Face" is featured on Triple B Records' 2010 America's Hardcore Compilation.

History
Cruel Hand formed in Portland, Maine, in 2006, originally as a side project of the punk band Outbreak, creating an opportunity for band members to play different instruments.  In 2007 they released their debut album Without a Pulse, on 6131 Records. They played shows around the U.S. with Trash Talk and The Mongoloids, touring the United States three times and a full European tour.  Cruel Hand then signed with Bridge 9 for their second album, Prying Eyes, which was recorded at Getaway Recording Studios and God City Studios in 2008. Cruel Hand released a self-titled 7-inch EP in 2010 featuring a song from their third album, Lock & Key and an unreleased track. Lock & Key was released on July 27, 2010, on Bridge 9 Records.  They have toured extensively throughout the U.S., Europe, and Australia supporting their latest release. On November 5, 2012, Cruel hand released a new video and new track titled "Cheap Life".

Cruel Hand are influenced by the Cro-Mags, early Metallica, and Madball, and are often compared to the seminal Toronto hardcore band No Warning.

Timeline

Discography
Studio albums
Without a Pulse (2007, 6131 Records)
Prying Eyes (2008, Bridge 9 Records)
Lock & Key (2010, Bridge 9 Records)
The Negatives (2014, Hopeless Records)
Your World Won't Listen (2016, Hopeless Records)

EPs
Life in Shambles (2008, Bridge 9)
Cruel Hand (2010, Bridge 9)
Vigilant Citizen (2013, Triple B Records)
Born Into Debt, We All Owe a Death (2013, Closed Casket Activities)
Dark Side of the Cage (2021, Static Era Records)

Demos
Cruel Hand Demo '06 (2006)

Music videos
 "3s" (2013)
 "Cheap Life" (2014)
 "Monument Square People" (2014)
 "Unhinged - Unraveled" (2014)
 "Heat" (2015)
 "Dead Eyes Watching" (2016)
 "Decompose" (2016)

References

External links
 Cruel Hand | Listen and Stream Free Music, Albums, New Releases, Photos, Videos
 Cruel Hand

Hardcore punk groups from Maine
Musical groups established in 2006
Musical quintets
Musical groups from Portland, Maine
Bridge 9 Records artists
2006 establishments in the United States
Rock music groups from Maine
Hopeless Records artists